Now I Can Die in Peace: How ESPN's Sports Guy Found Salvation, With a Little Help From Nomar, Pedro, Shawshank and the 2004 Red Sox is a 2006 sports anthology of original columns written by ESPN sports writer Bill Simmons. Simmons, a passionate Boston Red Sox fan, chronicles the team's 2004 season and 2004 World Series win.

Reviews 
Booklist starred its review and said Simmons' tone was a "refreshing, funny take on Boston's reversal of fortune."

Summary 
Now I Can Die in Peace is a collection of Simmons' articles from 1999 to 2004. It chronicles events such as Pedro Martínez's 1999 Cy Young season, the loss to the New York Yankees in the 2003 ALCS, and the 2004 ALCS, when the Red Sox won the last 4 games after they lost the first three games of the series. It contains frequent pop culture references and comparisons to The Shawshank Redemption. One interesting article Simmons included in the book is not about baseball at all; it's his famous "Silence of the Rams" column that was written after the New England Patriots defeated St. Louis to win Super Bowl XXXVI. Simmons wrote that if the "Fredo of the Boston sports scene" could win a championship, then it was possible for the Red Sox to someday end their then-84-year-long title drought.

References

2006 non-fiction books
ESPN
Major League Baseball books
Boston Red Sox